Tibia shaft fracture is a fracture of the proximal (upper) third of the tibia (lower leg bone). Due to the location of the tibia, it is frequently injured. Thus it is the most commonly fractured long bone in the body.

Signs and symptoms 
Patients with tibial shaft fractures present with pain and localized swelling. Due to the pain they are unable to bear weight. There may be deformity, angulation, or malroation of the leg. Fractures that are open (bone exposed or breaking the skin) are common.

Mechanism 
Since approximately one third of the tibia lies directly beneath the skin, open fractures are common compared to other long bones. These open fractures are most commonly caused by high velocity trauma (e.g. motor vehicle collisions), while closed fractures most commonly occur from sports injuries or falls. Osteoporosis can be a contributing factor. Skiing and football (soccer) injuries are also common culprits.

Diagnosis

Examination 
Prior to realignment and splinting an assessment is performed to ensure there are no open wounds, soft-tissue contusions, or neurovascular injuries.

Radiography 
Anteroposterior (AP) and lateral radiographs the include the entire length of the lower leg (knee to ankle) are highly sensitive and specific for tibial shaft fractures.

Classification 
Two systems of fracture classification are commonly used to aid diagnosis and management of tibia shaft fractures:
 Oestern and Tscherne Classification
 Gustilo-Anderson Classification
Management is dependent on the determination of whether the fracture is open or closed.

Management

Nonoperative treatment 
Nonsurgical treatment of tibia shaft fractures is now limited to closed, stable, isolated, minimally displaced fractures caused by a low-energy mechanism of injury. This treatment consists of application of a long-leg cast.

Operative treatment 
Surgical treatment is typically indicated for high-energy trauma fractures. Intramedullary nailing is a common technique, but external fixation may have equivalent outcomes.

Epidemiology 
Tibia shaft fractures are the most common long bone fractures. They account for approximately 4% of the fractures seen in the Medicare population. Tibia shaft fractures are particularly common injuries in certain sports, such as in MMA, where a successful check against an incoming low kick (a defensive technique in which the receiver's shin is used to block the low kick) can result in the practitioner fracturing their own shin.

References

External links 

Bone fractures